Johann Georg van Caspel (1870-1928) was a Dutch painter of portraits and murals.

Selected works

References

External links
 

1870 births
1928 deaths
Dutch male painters
19th-century Dutch painters
20th-century Dutch painters
19th-century Dutch male artists
20th-century Dutch male artists